Al-Bathaa Sport Club, is an Iraqi football team based in Dhi Qar, that plays in Iraq Division Three.

Managerial history
 Tahseen Ali
 Sadeq Abbas Al-Ta'an
 Ali Hadi

See also 
 2002–03 Iraq FA Cup

References

External links
 Al-Bathaa SC on Goalzz.com
 Iraq Clubs- Foundation Dates

1992 establishments in Iraq
Association football clubs established in 1992
Football clubs in Dhi Qar